The Fire observation Tower Rennbeck is a  tall observation tower built of wood on the Rennberg near Oer in Germany.
It is built in an unusual triangular cross section.

See also
List of towers

Observation towers in North Rhine-Westphalia